Freddy González Urrutia (born 8 August 1988) is a Colombian professional footballer.

References

1988 births
Living people
Colombian footballers
C.D. Dragón footballers
Colombian expatriate footballers
Expatriate footballers in El Salvador
Association football defenders
Footballers from Cali